Julio Pinto Vallejos (born 1956) is a Chilean historian. He is known in Chile for his study of social history and interpretations of social movements. In 2016 he won the Chilean National History Award. He is a member of the editorial board of LOM Ediciones.

Bibliography
Cien anos de propuestas y combates. La historiografía chilena del siglo XX. México: Universidad Autónoma Metropolitana
Expansión minera y desarrollo industrial :un caso de crecimiento asociado (Chile 1850-1914), Santiago, Universidad de Santiago, 1990 (coauthored with Luis Ortega).
 Trabajos y rebeldías en la pampa salitrera: el ciclo del salitre y la reconfiguración de las identidades populares (1850-1900), Santiago, Universidad de Santiago, 1998.
 Expansión minera y desarrollo industrial :un caso de crecimiento asociado (Chile 1850-1914), Santiago, Universidad de Santiago, 1990 (coauthored with Luis Ortega).
 Desgarros y utopías en la pampa salitrera: la consolidación de la identidad obrera en tiempos de la cuestión social (1890-1923), Santiago, LOM Ediciones, 2007.
 ¿Chilenos todos? La construcción social de la nación (1810-1840), Santiago, Lom Ediciones, 2009 (coauthored with Verónica Valdivia).
 ¿Revolución proletaria o querida chusma? Socialismo y Alessandrismo en la pugna por la politización pampina (1911-1932), Santiago, LOM Ediciones, 2001 (coauthored with Verónica Valdivia).
 Luis Emilio Recabarren. Una biografía histórica, Santiago, LOM Ediciones, 2013.
 El orden y el bajo pueblo. Los regímenes de Portales y Rosas frente al mundo popular, 1829-1852, Santiago, LOM Ediciones, 2014 (coauthored with Daniel Palma, Karen Donoso and Roberto Pizarro).
Historia Contemporánea de Chile (coauthored with Gabriel Salazar) (1999)

References

20th-century Chilean historians
20th-century Chilean male writers
21st-century Chilean historians
21st-century Chilean male writers
1956 births
Living people
Academic staff of the University of Santiago, Chile
Yale University alumni
Academic staff of the University of Talca
Chilean exiles
Social historians